Middle Mountain is part of the Sierra Nevada mountain range in California.

Middle Mountain may also refer to:

Middle Mountain (New Hampshire)
Middle Mountain (Delaware County, New York)
Middle Mountain (Hamilton County, New York)
Middle Mountain (West Virginia), part of the Shavers Fork Mountain Complex